Rhigonematidae is a family of nematodes belonging to the order Oxyurida.

Genera:
 Dudekemia Artigas, 1930
 Glomerinema Van Waerebeke, 1985
 Obainia Adamson, 1983
 Rhigonema Cobb, 1898

References

Nematodes